Andrew Burns ( – 12 February 2008) was a member of the Real IRA, killed by Óglaigh na hÉireann. According to The Guardian, at the time of his death, Burns was believed to have been, "the first victim of a Republican terrorist murder in Northern Ireland for six years."

A native of Strabane, Northern Ireland, Burns was killed in the churchyard at Doneyloop, Castlefin, a small village in County Donegal, under the pretext that he "was required to go on an IRA operation in which it was intended to murder a PSNI officer who was dating a girl in Donnyloop, in County Donegal. When they got to Donnyloop, they were met by three men who were known as members of Óglaigh na hÉireann.":

Martin Kelly (then aged 37) of Strabane, a bus driver, was found guilty of Burns' murder in December 2011, and sentenced to life in prison. He had transported Burns to Donegal, where Burns was shot dead.

See also
 Murder of Matthew Burns
 Murder of James Curran

References

External links
 Citylocal.ie
 Donegaldemocrat.ie
 Ulsterherald.com
 Irishtimes.com
 Highlandradio.com
 Bbc.co.uk
 Belfasttelegraphy.co.uk
 Cain.ulst.acuk

People from Strabane
Murder victims from Northern Ireland
Deaths by firearm in the Republic of Ireland
Deaths by person in the Republic of Ireland
People murdered by Irish organized crime
People murdered in the Republic of Ireland
2008 murders in the Republic of Ireland